The 2023 Women's World Chess Championship is an upcoming chess match for the Women's World Chess Championship title. It is contested by the defending champion Ju Wenjun (winning the 2020 match) and her challenger, the winner of the 2022–23 Candidates tournament.

It will be played in two Chinese cities from 5 to 25 July 2023. Giving each participant a home-field advantage.

Candidates tournament

The second edition of the women's Candidates is played in the last quarter of 2022. The eight players who qualified are: In contrast to the previous edition, this was played in a knock-out format.

It featured eight players, including three former Women's World champions. In the final, two Chinese players will play a six game match to determine the Challenger spot.

Match
The match is scheduled for 5 to 25 July 2023. Like in 2018 it will be played in two halfes, giving each player a home advantage. The host cities are Chongqing and Shanghai. It is not yet dicided, which city hosts which half.

The format of the championship is a 12 game match like in previous years.

Notes

References

External links
 FIDE Women's World Championship Cycle 2020 — 2022

Women's World Chess Championships
2023 in chess
Chess
Chess